Thomas Oxley may refer to:
Thomas Oxley (British surgeon) (1805–1886), surgeon of the Straits Settlements
Thomas Oxley (neurologist) (born 1980), neurologist and executive at Synchron